The  was a Japanese clan prominent during the Sengoku Period which claimed descent from the Fujiwara clan.

Gamō clan heads (before taking Gamō name) 
 Fujiwara no Hidesato
 Fujiwara Chitsuji
 Fujiwara Senkiyo
 Fujiwara Yorikiyo
 Fujiwara Yoritoshi
 Fujiwara Suetoshi

Gamō clan heads (after taking Gamō name) 
 Satoshi
 Korekata
 Toshitsuna
 Toshimune
 Shigetoshi
 Ujitoshi
 Toshitsuna
 Hideyori
 Takahide
 Hidetane
 Hidekane
 Hidesada
 Hidetsuna
 Sadahide (1444-1514)
 Hideyuki (d.1513)
 Hidenori (d.1525)
 Sadahide (1508-1579)
 Gamō Katahide
 Gamō Ujisato
 Gamō Hideyuki
 Tadasato (1602-1627)
 Tadatomo (1604-1634)

Gamō Katahide 
Gamō Katahide (蒲生 賢秀, 1534 – May 26, 1584) was a Japanese daimyō of the Sengoku period through Azuchi-Momoyama Period. Katahide, the eldest son of Gamō Sadahide, was a retainer of the Oda clan.

Gamō Ujisato 
Gamō Ujisato (蒲生 氏郷, 1556 – March 17, 1595) was the heir and son of Gamō Katahide, lord of Hino Castle in Ōmi Province. He later held Matsusaka (Ise Province) and finally Aizuwakamatsu Castle (Aizu Domain) in Mutsu Province. He was the son-in-law of Oda Nobunaga.

Gamō Hideyuki 
Gamō Hideyuki (蒲生 秀行, 1583 – June 13, 1612) was a Japanese daimyō who ruled the Aizu domain. He was the son of Gamō Ujisato. A Catholic, Hideyuki was moved to Utsunomiya (180,000 koku) in Shimotsuke Province after his father died in 1595. In 1600, he was given Aizu, worth 600,000 koku.

Gamō Yorisato
Gamō Bitchū (蒲生 備中, unknown - October 21, 1600), also known as Gamō Yorisato (蒲生 頼郷), was a samurai of the Gamō clan during the Azuchi-Momoyama Period. Very few details about Gamo Bitchū exist, and historians remain unsure as to whether Gamo was named Yorisato or Satoie. Gamō Bitchū fought at the Battle of Sekigahara with 1,000 Gamō samurai on the Western side. He confronted against Oda Nagamasu Eastern forces. Under the losing forces of Ishida Mitsunari. He died on the battlefield along with the bulk of his men.

References 
 "Gamō-shi" on Harimaya.com (15 June 2008)

 
Japanese clans